Beneath the Surface may refer to:

Music
 Beneath the Surface (GZA album), released in 1999
 Beneath the Surface (record label), a record label of hip-hop producer Omid Walizadeh
 An Dara Craiceann: Beneath The Surface, a 1995 album by Irish singer Pádraigín Ní Uallacháin
 Beneath the Surface, a 2002 album by Balligomingo
 Beneath the Surface, a 1996 album by Incognito
 "Beneath the Surface", a song by Souljahz from the 2002 album The Fault Is History

Visual media
 Beneath the Surface (1997 film), a Swedish film directed by Daniel Fridell
 Beneath the Surface (2007 film), American comedy horror film by Blake Reigle
 Beneath the Surface (picture book), by Gary Crew and illustrated by Steven Woolman

 "Beneath the Surface" (Stargate SG-1), an episode of the American-Canadian TV series

See also
 Below the Surface (disambiguation)